Jeremy Lee Renner (born January 7, 1971) is an American actor. He began his career by appearing in independent films such as Dahmer (2002) and Neo Ned (2005), then supporting roles in bigger films, such as S.W.A.T. (2003) and 28 Weeks Later (2007). Renner gained Academy Award nominations for Best Actor for his performance as a soldier in The Hurt Locker (2008) and for Best Supporting Actor for playing a hot-headed robber in The Town (2010).

Renner has played Clint Barton / Hawkeye in the Marvel Cinematic Universe, beginning with Thor (2011) and The Avengers (2012), and most recently starring in the Disney+ miniseries Hawkeye (2021). He also appeared in the action films Mission: Impossible – Ghost Protocol (2011), The Bourne Legacy (2012), Hansel & Gretel: Witch Hunters (2013) and Mission: Impossible – Rogue Nation (2015); and the dramas American Hustle (2013), Arrival (2016), and Wind River (2017). Since 2021, he has starred in the Paramount+ crime thriller series Mayor of Kingstown.

Early life
Renner was born in Modesto, California, to mother Valerie Cearley ( Tague) and father Lee Renner, who managed McHenry Bowl, a Modesto bowling alley, in the 1980s. His parents married as teenagers and divorced when he was ten. He is the oldest of seven siblings, the youngest of whom was born in 2011. He is of Irish and German descent.

Renner graduated from Fred C. Beyer High School in Modesto in 1989. He attended Modesto Junior College, where he studied computer science and criminology, before he took a drama class as an elective and decided to pursue acting.

Career

Early work
Renner made his film debut as an underachieving student in the 1995 comedy National Lampoon's Senior Trip. Although the film was critically panned, he went on to guest star on two television shows, Deadly Games and Strange Luck, and had a minor role in the television film A Friend's Betrayal as the friend of Paul Hewitt (Brian Austin Green). Over the next few years, Renner had guest roles in Zoe, Duncan, Jack and Jane (1999), The Net (1999), The Time of Your Life (1999), and Angel (2000). In 2001 Renner had a small role in an episode of CSI: Crime Scene Investigation. Renner worked as a makeup artist during this period to help make ends meet.

Early success: 2002–2008
In 2002, Renner starred in Dahmer as the eponymous serial killer Jeffrey Dahmer. He found the non-fiction role a challenge to cope with after he had finished shooting the film, knowing that Dahmer had murdered seventeen victims. His performance was well received, and he gained a nomination for the Independent Spirit Award for Best Lead Male. He also appeared in Pink's 2003 music video for her song "Trouble" as a Bad Boy Sheriff. Renner went on to appear in S.W.A.T. as the former police partner of Colin Farrell's character in 2003 and The Heart Is Deceitful Above All Things in 2004.

In 2005, Renner starred with Julia Stiles and Forest Whitaker in A Little Trip to Heaven, with roles in North Country and 12 and Holding. He next starred as a neo-Nazi skinhead who is admitted into a psychiatric hospital in Neo Ned with Gabrielle Union. The film won awards at multiple film festivals, including the Palm Beach International Film Festival Award for Best Actor. Renner also had a small (though uncredited) role in skateboard film Lords of Dogtown as the manager of Emile Hirsch's character. In 2006, he starred with Ginnifer Goodwin in Love Comes to the Executioner.

In 2007 Renner had supporting roles in the critically acclaimed The Assassination of Jesse James by the Coward Robert Ford as Wood Hite, the cousin of outlaw Jesse James (portrayed by Brad Pitt), and as Sergeant Doyle in 28 Weeks Later. He starred with Minnie Driver in Take and guest-starred as a patient (a reckless rock musician) in an episode of House. Renner had a role in the pilot of The Oaks, but the series was not picked up.

2009–2012: critical and commercial breakout
After starring with Dallas Roberts in the comedy-drama Ingenious and starring in the short-lived television series The Unusuals, Renner went on to achieve critical success for his portrayal of U.S. Army bomb disposal expert Sergeant First Class William James in the 2009 Iraq war thriller The Hurt Locker (directed by Kathryn Bigelow). The role earned him several awards in the Best Actor category and his first Academy Award nomination for Best Actor as well a Screen Actors Guild Award nomination.

In 2010, Renner's performance in Ben Affleck's The Town alongside Jon Hamm, Blake Lively, Slaine and Michael Yebba received extremely positive reviews and earned Renner's second Academy Award nomination, for Best Supporting Actor. He also gained his first Golden Globe nomination for Best Supporting Actor and his second Screen Actors Guild nomination. The Hollywood Reporter named Renner as one of the young male actors who are "pushing – or being pushed" into taking over Hollywood as the new "A-List".

In 2011, Renner had an uncredited cameo appearance as Hawkeye in Thor for familiarity with his character for The Avengers, which was released in May 2012. The same year, he also starred in the fourth film in the Bourne franchise, The Bourne Legacy, which was written and directed by Tony Gilroy. Renner played a new lead character, Aaron Cross, in place of Jason Bourne, who was played by Matt Damon in the first three films. Renner has expressed interest in doing a Bourne film with Damon in the future, stating that "[it] would be kick-ass. I love Matt".

2013–present: continued work

Renner starred in the action horror film Hansel & Gretel: Witch Hunters (released in January 2013), in which he and Gemma Arterton played Hansel and Gretel, respectively. The 3-D film was set 15 years after Hansel and Gretel killed the witch who kidnapped them. Renner was also featured in the ensemble cast of David O. Russell's dramedy American Hustle, based on the controversial FBI ABSCAM operation of the late 1970s and early 1980s. The film, which was released in December 2013, also starred Christian Bale, Bradley Cooper, Amy Adams and Jennifer Lawrence in principal roles. The film earned much critical acclaim, including the Screen Actors Guild Award for Outstanding Performance by a Cast in a Motion Picture and a nomination for the Academy Award for Best Picture. In October 2014, Renner starred as journalist Gary Webb in the Focus Features film Kill the Messenger, based on Webb's book Dark Alliance. Renner also co-produced the film. In December 2014, Crackle aired The Throwaways, a film for which Renner served as executive producer.

In 2015, Renner reprised his role as Hawkeye in Avengers: Age of Ultron, the sequel to The Avengers. He returned to the Mission: Impossible franchise in Mission: Impossible – Rogue Nation, released in July 2015. In 2016, Renner played Hawkeye again in the summer blockbuster film Captain America: Civil War, and starred with Amy Adams in the sci-fi film Arrival. Renner is a producer of the 2016 film The Founder starring Michael Keaton as Ray Kroc. In 2015, his production company The Combine signed a deal with PalmStar Media.

In 2016, History announced their historical drama Knightfall, executive-produced by Renner. In 2017, while working on the film Tag (2018), Renner fractured his right elbow and his left wrist. He also appeared in the film Wind River with his MCU co-star Elizabeth Olsen.

Renner filmed scenes as Hawkeye for Avengers: Infinity War but ultimately did not appear in the film. Because of resulting scheduling conflicts, he was unable to reprise the role of William Brandt in Mission: Impossible – Fallout (2018). In July 2018, Jeremy Renner was announced to play Twitch Williams in Todd McFarlane's Spawn reboot. He had a starring role in Avengers: Endgame (2019), and thereafter played Hawkeye in a 2021 Disney+ series on the character. On the same year, Renner starred in the Paramount+ series Mayor of Kingstown, which was renewed for a second season set to broadcast in 2023.

Music
Renner is also a singer-songwriter, guitarist, keyboardist, and drummer. Early in his acting career, he performed in the Sons of Ben. He has performed songs on several film soundtracks: "I Drink Alone" for North Country, "American Pie" for Love Comes to the Executioner, and "Good Ole Rebel" for The Assassination of Jesse James by the Coward Robert Ford. He also appeared in music videos for "Trouble" by P!nk and "Scenes on Sunset" by Brother Sal.
He was featured in Sam Feldt's 2018 single, "Heaven (Don't Have a Name)".

He released his first extended play, The Medicine, in March 2020.

Jeremy Renner Official mobile app

Renner released a mobile app called "Jeremy Renner" (Android) and "Jeremy Renner Official" (iOS) in March 2017. The app was created by Escapex, a company that specializes in monetized apps for celebrities. Fast Company wrote extensively about Renner's app in April 2019, calling it "a surprising new kind of social media".

The community developed to include memes, selfies, and a "Happy Rennsday" event on Wednesdays. As early as October 2017, there were claims of censorship, bullying, and "contest-rigging". In September 2019, comedian Stefan Heck publicized his discovery of the fact that replies through the app appear as if they were sent by Renner himself in push notifications. After several users abused this feature, Renner asked Escapex to shut down the app.

Personal life
Renner married Canadian model Sonni Pacheco on January 13, 2014. Renner and Pacheco have a daughter. On December 30, 2014, Pacheco filed for divorce from Renner, citing irreconcilable differences. They share custody of their daughter. Pacheco and their daughter made cameo appearances in the film American Hustle.

Since 2014, Renner has lived in Washoe County, Nevada, near Nevada State Route 431 and the Mount Rose ski resort. He has a house-renovating business with his best friend and fellow actor, Kristoffer Winters. He has studied Arnis and Muay Thai martial arts as preparation for his roles in the Mission: Impossible and Avengers franchises. 

Renner is a fan of the San Francisco 49ers. He narrated the NFL Network documentary series The Timeline episode "A Tale of Two Cities", which chronicles the history of the team's rivalry with the Dallas Cowboys, and the introductory video for the grand opening of Levi's Stadium.

On January 1, 2023, Renner was hospitalized after an accident in which he suffered blunt chest trauma and other injuries after being hit and run over by his snowplow at home. According to the Washoe County sheriff, the snowplow at issue was an "extremely large" snowcat weighing .  Renner was flown by helicopter to a local hospital,  later confirmed to be Renown Regional Medical Center (the region's only trauma center).  A representative said he was in "critical but stable condition". As of January 2, he had undergone surgery and remained in the intensive care unit in critical condition. On January 3, Renner posted a selfie to his Instagram account thanking fans for their support and stating that he was still too hurt to type. On January 17, Renner announced he had been released from the hospital and had returned home to continue his recovery. On January 21, Renner revealed via his Instagram account that he had broken over 30 bones in the accident.

Filmography

Film

Television

Discography
Extended plays (EPs)

The Medicine (2020)
Live For Now (2020)

Singles

"Main Attraction" (2019)

Awards and nominations

References

Further reading

External links

 
 
 

1971 births
20th-century American male actors
21st-century American male actors
21st-century American musicians
American make-up artists
American male film actors
American male stage actors
American male television actors
American people of German descent
American people of Irish descent
Film producers from California
Living people
Male actors from Modesto, California
Modesto Junior College alumni
Musicians from Modesto, California
Outstanding Performance by a Cast in a Motion Picture Screen Actors Guild Award winners